Who Am I (English: "Who Am I: No System Is Safe") is a 2014 German techno-thriller film directed by Baran bo Odar. It is centered on a computer hacker group in Berlin geared towards global fame. It was screened in the Contemporary World Cinema section at the 2014 Toronto International Film Festival. The film was shot in Berlin and Rostock. Because of its storyline and some elements, the film is often compared to Fight Club and Mr. Robot.

Plot

Benjamin Engel, a hacker from Berlin, sits in an interrogation room. The officer in charge tells Hanne Lindberg, Head of the Cyber Division of Europol, that Benjamin asked to conduct the interrogation. Benjamin says that he has information regarding FR13NDS, a notorious hacking group of four members connected to the Russian cyber mafia, and MRX, an infamous hacker known on Darknet; he tells her that he could give them both to Hanne if she listens to him. Having no choice, Hanne sits down.

Benjamin tells Hanne that he is like a superhero: like many heroes, he, too, has no parents; he never met his father as he abandoned the family when Benjamin was born, and his mother committed suicide when he was 8. He lives alone with his ailing grandmother. He regards his "superpower" as invisibility, as he was never noticed by most people during his childhood, due to him being socially awkward. He says he learned programming and hacked his first system when he was 14. Though he felt like a loser in real life, he felt a sense of belonging on the Internet. While spending most of his time on Darknet, he met his hacking hero, MRX, whose identity no one knows and who can hack into any system. Benjamin aspires to be like him.

However, as he was unable to attend university, he worked as a pizza delivery boy to pay the bills. He tells Hanne that, one night while he delivered pizzas to a group of students, he saw Marie, a girl with whom he was in love since his school days. Hearing her having trouble with examinations, he decided to help her and be a 'superhero'. He went to the University, hacked into its servers to download the exam questions—but he was caught by a security guard and arrested. Having no prior criminal record, he was forced to perform community service as a punishment.

He tells Hanne that while working on cleaning the streets as punishment, he met Max, a fellow hacker, who Benjamin feels is the opposite of himself; a charismatic, cocky and confident individual. Later, Max had introduced him to his colleagues Stephan and Paul. After Benjamin proved himself as a hacker, Max explained to him that the concept of social engineering is the greatest form of hacking. They decide to form a hacking group, called "Clowns Laughing At You", nicknamed CLAY, and they use Benjamin's house as a base of operations, since Benjamin was forced to send his grandmother to a nursing home due to her Alzheimer's disease. They cause general mayhem around Berlin in a form of pranking, becoming popular around social media. However, MRX, with whom is Max obsessed, mocks them outright. Infuriated, Max wants to perform a more outrageous feat of hacking, and Benjamin suggest hacking the main building of BND (German Central Intelligence). Impressed by this outrageous idea, the group agrees with Benjamin and decide to hack the BND in order to impress MRX.

Using dumpster diving and phishing to gain access to the BND building, they manage to hack the internal servers and hack the printers to print their logo, titled "NO SYSTEM IS SAFE", all around the building, impressing MRX. However, when they go to a club and celebrate, Benjamin notices Max kissing Marie. Infuriated, Benjamin refuses to let them into the house, also offending Marie when she visits him due to his anger. Feeling inferior, he secretly contacts MRX, offering him valuable information: a database from BND's private servers, which he hacked while he was in the BND building, which impresses MRX. When the group arrives the next day, Benjamin is still furious and attacks Max, who responds by beating him up. However, Paul, watching the TV, hears on the news that one of the members of FR13NDS, nicknamed Krypton, was murdered. Benjamin admits that he gave the information from the BND to MRX, and after checking them, realizes that the information identified Krypton as a double agent working with Hanne to expose MRX and FR13NDS, and CLAY is now labeled as a terrorist group for hacking the information.

Seeking to clear their name for the murder, Benjamin contacts MRX, who instructs them to hack into the Europol database in exchange for MRX's identity, giving them a hacking tool to help. After dissolving their hard drives in acid to erase data, they travel to Europol's headquarters in The Hague in order to try and break their way in—but it's impossible to find a way inside.  The headquarters dump their trash in a secured building, the sewers are locked, and phishing attempts failed. However, while checking out the building, Benjamin notices a group of scholars visiting the building, and one of them drops his visitor card.  Using Max's advice about social engineering, Benjamin manages to gain access to the building by fooling a guard and plants a hacking device inside. He then hacks into the internal Europol servers and provides MRX with an entrance, secretly encoded inside a double trojan horse so MRX will be exposed when he tries to gain access. However, MRX, anticipating this, takes a snapshot of Benjamin via his webcam, exposing him. Benjamin is forced to flee when a group of Russian mobsters finds him; he evades them in the subway.

Benjamin returns to the hotel where he was staying with the trio, only to find them murdered. Having no other choice and knowing that FRI3NDS would kill him, he decided to turn himself in to Hanne, proving that he is serious after stating that he hacked her profile and learned personal information about her. Hanne, who was suspended for her failure to capture them and is desperate to apprehend FRI3NDS and MRX, agrees to put Benjamin into a witness protection program in exchange for capturing them.  Benjamin logs in as MRX himself and spreads lies about MRX being a snitch, forcing the real MRX to force his way into the Darknet servers with unsafe methods, allowing Benjamin to expose him.  MRX is exposed as a 19-year-old American boy from New York City, whom the FBI arrests in a coffee shop.

However, after agreeing to give Benjamin the witness exchange program, Hanne notices a wound going through his palm (the same wound that Max got after running a nail through his hand), and realizes that Max, Stephan and Paul are all made-up characters. Distraught, she visits Benjamin's doctor, who states that his mother had multiple personality disorder and committed suicide because of it, learning that it can be genetically inherited. Hanne connects various plot holes in Benjamin's story and realizes that "he" alone was CLAY; he committed all the atrocities, he hacked into the BND alone, and he planted the WWII bullets from his grandmother in the hotel to make it look like they were killed, imagining the trio due to his illness. Hanne confronts Benjamin, who has an emotional breakdown, as people with mental disorders cannot be given witness protection. However, Hanne changes her mind and allows him access to the witness protection program, revealed to be an "actual" program containing information about all citizens of Germany; Benjamin changes his identity here. Hanne, dropping Benjamin off, states that she let him go because he truly wants to stay invisible, and lets him go on the condition that he never hacks again.

Benjamin, now sporting blonde hair, is standing alone on a  Scandlines ferry heading north. However, he is suddenly joined by Marie, Max, Stephan and Paul. In narration, Benjamin states that he performed "the greatest social engineering hack" ever; the scene shifts back to Benjamin going back to the hotel, finding the guys alive and well; he instructs them to flee since MRX knows his identity, but they refuse to leave him behind. After Marie visits them and confirms that mentally ill subjects cannot be granted witness protection, they devise a plan for Benjamin to go to Hanne and dictate the story, deliberately giving plot holes which she will most likely decipher, and then using her grief for him to give him access to the witness protection program, and also spiking his hand with a nail to make the story seem truthful. In the server room, it was revealed that Benjamin didn't change his identity, he "erased" it completely. Benjamin states that Hanne will eventually realize his deception, but she won't hunt him down as she got what she wanted. Indeed, at a press conference announcing the defeat of FR13NDS and MRX, Hanne, having an epiphany, smiles as she realizes the truth.

Cast
 Tom Schilling as Benjamin Engel
 Elyas M'Barek as Max
 Hannah Herzsprung as Marie
 Wotan Wilke Möhring as Stephan
 Antoine Monot, Jr. as Paul
 Trine Dyrholm as Hanne Lindberg
Stephan Kampwirth as Martin Bohmer
Leonard Carow as MRX
 Lena Dörrie as BKA Investigator

Reception 
The film premiered in the Contemporary World Cinema section at the 2014 Toronto International Film Festival. It was also screened at the 17th European Union Film Festival. The film won three German Movie Awards and the Bambi for Best German Film.

Other versions
Warner Bros. struck a deal in 2014 to remake the film. David Goyer is set to direct the film. The script will be written by Dan Wiedenhaupt, who wrote the Albert Hughes-directed The Solutrean. The film will be produced by Goyer and his Phantom Four banner, along with Kevin Turen and Langley Park's Kevin McCormick.

References

External links
 
 

2014 films
2010s thriller films
2010s German-language films
2010s English-language films
German thriller films
English-language German films
Films about computing
Films shot in Berlin
Malware in fiction
Techno-thriller films
Works about computer hacking
2010s German films